Tullamore railway station serves the town of Tullamore in County Offaly, Ireland.

The station lies on the Dublin to Galway and Dublin to Westport or Ballina line.

History
The station first opened in Tullamore on 2 October 1854.

Awards 
2004 - 2nd Prize - Intercity Stations Category
2003 - 2nd Prize - Intercity Stations Category
2002 - Best Overall Station
2002 - 1st Prize - Intercity Stations Category
1999 - 3rd Prize - Intercity Stations Category
1997 - Most Improved - InterCity Stations Category

See also
 List of railway stations in Ireland

References

External links
 Irish Rail Tullamore Station Website

Buildings and structures in Tullamore
Iarnród Éireann stations in County Offaly
Railway stations in County Offaly
Railway stations opened in 1854
1854 establishments in Ireland
Railway stations in the Republic of Ireland opened in the 19th century